The 1955 South Carolina Gamecocks football team represented the University of South Carolina as a member of the Atlantic Coast Conference (ACC) during the 1954 college football season. Led by Rex Enright in his 15th and final season as head coach, the Gamecocks compiled an overall record of 3–6 with a mark of 1–5 in conference play, tying for sixth place in the ACC. The team played home games at Carolina Stadium in Columbia, South Carolina.

Schedule

References

South Carolina
South Carolina Gamecocks football seasons
South Carolina Gamecocks football